Wolchulsan National Park lies in Jeollanam-do province, South Korea. Designated as a national park in 1988, Wolchulsan National Park is South Korea's smallest at only .

The park takes its name from Wolchulsan, or Mt. Wolchul in Gangjin and Yeongam counties. Also contained in the park are 3 national treasures and a number of local cultural properties.

Points of interest
Dogapsa Temple (도갑사), South Korean National Treasure #50. The Buddhist temple has yet to be restored since it was burned down during the Korean War.

References

External links
The park's page on Korea National Park Service's website

National parks of South Korea
Parks in South Jeolla Province
Protected areas established in 1988
Gangjin County
Yeongam County